This is a list of Italian football transfers featuring at least one Serie A or Serie B club which were completed from 1 July 2016 to 31 August 2016, date in which the summer transfer window would close. Free agent could join any club at any time.

Transfers
Legend
Those clubs in Italic indicate that the player already left the team on loan on this or the previous season or new signing that immediately left the club

February - May

June

July

August - September

Footnotes

References
general
 
 
specific

Summer transfers
2016
Italian